Fudbalski klub Partizan is a Serbian professional association football club based in Belgrade, Serbia, who currently play in the Serbian SuperLiga. They have played at their current home ground, Partizan Stadium, since 1949.

In Partizan's history, 41 coaches have coached the club. The first manager was Franjo Glaser and the current manager is Aleksandar Stanojević, who was again appointed on 2 September 2020. Ljubiša Tumbaković had the longest reign as Partizan coach, with nine years (seven consecutive) in charge, and is the most successful coach in Partizan history with six national championships and three national cup wins.

Managers
The following is the list of FK Partizan head coaches and their respective tenures on the bench:

Managerial statistics (1970–present)

References

External links
 Official website

 
Partizan